Bollywood Diaries is a 2016 Indian Hindi-language drama film written and directed by K.D.Satyam. It features Raima Sen, Salim Diwan, and Ashish Vidyarthi, along with Karuna Pandey and Vineet Kumar Singh. Produced by Dr. Sattar Diwan, the film was released on 26 February 2016.

Plot 
The story revolves around three unrelated individuals – Rohit (Salim Diwan), a man working at a call-center in Delhi, Vishnu (Ashish Vidyarthi), a retired middle-aged government servant from Bhilai, and Imli (Raima Sen), a prostitute from Sonagachi, Kolkata. All three aspire to become Bollywood actors, and each of them undergoes several hardships in their struggle to breakthrough the industry. The movie shows the passion and madness of common individuals trying to realize their dreams in Bollywood.

Cast 
 Raima Sen as Imli
 Salim Diwan as Rohit
 Ashish Vidyarthi as Vishnu
 Karuna Pandey as Lata
 Vineet Kumar Singh as Daman
 Robin Das as Sundar Das
 Ekavali Khanna as Raveena

Production 

Principal photography of the film began in October 2014 and the shooting started one month later, in November. The film was shot in Bhilai, Kolkata and Delhi. During the filming, Ashish Vidyarthi suffered a mishap where he nearly drowned in the Shivnath river before being rescued by a policeman.

Release 
The film was released on 26 February 2016 across India.

Reception

Critical response

Subhash K. Jha said, "(viewers) should not miss this aspirational Bollywood saga." Rahul Desai called it, "a well-acted, unnerving film about Bollywood aspirations." Rohit Bhatnagar from The Deccan Chronicle said Bollywood Diaries is a "brilliant tribute to Bollywood Struggling actors." Martin D’Souza of Glamsham.com rated the film with three stars, describing it as "an honest film with great connect." The Free Press Journal's Johnson Thomas called it, "a bittersweet story that has passion and substance and is smartly devoid of formulaic expressionism." Bollyvision.com gave called it, "an honest film." Box Office India said it was, "worth a look."

The cinematography by Dev Agarwal was brilliant as he creates stark images, capturing the energy of the characters with an unforced realism," said Joginder Tuteja, giving reviews about this film. Subhash K. Jha called The Bollywood Diaries "An ordinary film that touches the heart - 3 stars." by Divay Agarwal. Komal Nahta said, "Bollywood Diaries is a very real portrayal of strugglers in Bollywood. It is a genuinely good attempt which should be seen by those who with of cinema and Bollywood."

References

External links 
 

2010s Hindi-language films
2016 films
Films about Bollywood
Films scored by Vipin Patwa